David Leon Herron, Jr. (born June 17, 1984) is a former American football linebacker. He played football at Warren G. Harding High School and college football at Michigan State. He was signed by the Minnesota Vikings as an undrafted free agent in 2007.

Herron has also been a member of the New England Patriots, Kansas City Chiefs and San Diego Chargers. He is the older brother of former Indianapolis Colts backup running back Daniel Herron.

External links
Michigan State Spartans bio
San Diego Chargers bio
Kansas City Chiefs bio 
Minnesota Vikings bio
New England Patriots bio

1984 births
Living people
Sportspeople from Warren, Ohio
Players of American football from Ohio
American football linebackers
American football fullbacks
Michigan State Spartans football players
Minnesota Vikings players
New England Patriots players
Kansas City Chiefs players
San Diego Chargers players
New York Jets players